Linda Sorenson (born January 19, 1940) is a Canadian film, television and voice actress, best known for playing Mrs. Stegman in Class of 1984, Warden Howe in Murphy Brown, Virginia Reeves in Material World and Isabelle Carrington in Road to Avonlea.   She has appeared in a number of film and television roles.

She voiced Love-a-Lot Bear in the Care Bears TV series, Blanche the Persian Cat in Webkinz and the old woman in Barbie and the Diamond Castle.

Sorenson has won two Genie Awards for Best Performance by an Actress in a Supporting Role in Joshua Then and Now and Draw!.

Filmography

Film

Television

Radio

Recognition 
 1995 Gemini Award for Best Guest Performance in a Series by an Actress - Road to Avonlea - Nominated
 1986 Genie Award for Best Performance by an Actress in a Supporting Role - Joshua Then and Now - Won
 1985 Genie Award for Best Performance by an Actress in a Supporting Role - Draw! - Won

References

External links 
 
 
 Linda Sorenson at Northern Stars

1940 births
Living people
Best Supporting Actress Genie and Canadian Screen Award winners
Canadian expatriates in the United States
Canadian film actresses
Canadian television actresses
Canadian voice actresses
Place of birth missing (living people)
20th-century Canadian actresses
21st-century Canadian actresses